Card Sharks is a 1988 game for the Commodore 64 developed and published by Accolade. It was designed by Mike Lorezen.

Gameplay
The player can choose between three card games:

Poker with three different variations: Five card draw, Seven card stud, Texas hold'em.
Hearts
Blackjack

Depending the chosen game the player selects up to three opponents. Besides three fictional characters (Luigi, Lady and Milton), the player can select Mikhail Gorbachev, Ronald Reagan, and Margaret Thatcher. The characters comment the game situation in a humorous way.

References

External links
Card Sharks at YouTube
Card Sharks manual

1987 video games
Accolade (company) games
Digital card games
Commodore 64 games
Commodore 64-only games
Cultural depictions of Mikhail Gorbachev
Cultural depictions of Ronald Reagan
Cultural depictions of Margaret Thatcher
Video games developed in the United States